ABC 11 may refer to one of the following television stations in the United States:

Current affiliates
 KHSD-TV in Lead, South Dakota (satellite of KOTA-TV in Rapid City, SD)
 WBKB-DT3 in Alpena, Michigan
 WHAS-TV in Louisville, Kentucky
 WJHL-DT2 in Johnson City, Tennessee
 WTOK-TV in Meridian, Mississippi
 WTVD in Raleigh/Durham, North Carolina (O&O)

Formerly affiliated
 KAQY in Monroe, Louisiana (1998 to 2014)
 KNTV in San Jose, California (1960 to 2000)
 KTHI in Fargo, North Dakota (1959 to 1983)
 KYMA in Yuma, Arizona / El Centro, California (1988 to 1991)
 WLUK in Green Bay, Wisconsin (1959 to 1983)
 WTCN in Minneapolis/Saint Paul, Minnesota (1953 to 1961)
 WXIA in Atlanta, Georgia (1951 to 1980)